Wolfgang Wesemann (born 30 October 1949) is a German former cyclist. He competed in the individual road race for East Germany at the 1972 Summer Olympics.

References

External links
 

1949 births
Living people
East German male cyclists
Olympic cyclists of East Germany
Cyclists at the 1972 Summer Olympics
Cyclists from Saxony-Anhalt
People from Wolmirstedt
People from Bezirk Magdeburg